William Gertz could refer to: 

Bill Gertz (born 1952), American journalist
William L. Gertz (born 1952), American business executive